The 1982 Baylor Bears football team represented Baylor University in the 1982 NCAA Division I-A football season.  The Bears finished the season fifth in the Southwest Conference.

Schedule

Game summaries

SMU

After the season
The following players were drafted into professional football following the season.

References

Baylor
Baylor Bears football seasons
Baylor Bears football